The White Fathers, officially the Missionaries of Africa abbreviated MAfr), are a Roman Catholic society of apostolic life of Pontifical Right (for Men) Founded in 1868 by then Archbishop of Algiers Charles-Martial Allemand-Lavigerie. The society focuses on evangelism and education, mostly in Africa. In 2021, there were 1428 members of the Missionaries of Africa of 36 nationalities, working in 42 countries, in 217 communities.

History

The cholera epidemic of 1867 left a large number of Algerian orphans, and the education and Christian instruction of these children was the occasion of the founding of the society in Maison-Carrée (now El-Harrach) near Algiers; but from its inception the founder had in mind the conversion of the Arabs and the peoples of Central Africa. Lavigerie instructed his missionaries to speak the language of the people, eat the same food, and wear the same clothing. They therefore adopted North African dress for their vestments: the gandoura for the cassock, the burnous for the mantle, and even the chechia for the Zucchetto.  They wore their rosary with crucifix as a necklace and token of their religion, in imitation of the misbaha of the marabouts. The nickname "White Fathers" derives from their garb.

A novitiate was established in 1868. Missionary posts were established in Kabylie and in the Sahara. In 1876 three missionaries on their way to Timbuktu were killed by desert nomads. In 1878 ten missionaries left Algiers to establish posts at Lakes Victoria, Nyassa and Tanganyika. In 1878, a caravan of several missionaries arrived at the port of Mombasa, and after a three-month trek reached Lake Victoria.

The White Fathers were the largest missionary society to operate in Zambia, as well as one of the earliest to settle in the country. Their first station was among the Mambwe, in the Tanganyika- Malawi corridor, established in 1891 (prior to the establishment of British rule). The people of Mambwe had been dominated by the politically and linguistically stronger ethnic group of Northern Zambia, the Bemba, towards whom the White Fathers directed subsequent efforts. The establishment of the Chilubula mission by the bishop of Nayasa Vicariate, Joseph Dunpont, in 1898, marked the beginning of the White Fathers’ colonisation of Lubemba. This allowed the missionary society to extend their work further than any other missionary society in Northern Rhodesia. By the mid-1930s, the White Fathers had around twenty missions, all of them located in present-day Northern Luapula and, to a lesser extent, Eastern provinces of Zambia. 
 
In addition, many of the documentations of the language of Luganda, spoken in Uganda, such as grammars, dictionaries and individual articles are in English or French. This can all be traced back to the French Catholic Missionary Congregation of the White Fathers and their impact on colonial history, between 1885 and 1921. The White Fathers who arrived at Lake Victoria region in 1879, published six Luganda grammars and dictionaries in French.

White Father missionaries in Algeria ransomed a young slave, Adrien Atiman, and arranged for his education. Atiman subsequently became a medical catechist with the White Fathers at Karema, and was responsible for a significant autobiographical account of his enslavement, subsequent freedom and integration into the White Fathers' mission.

In 1882, at the request of the Holy See, the White Fathers established St. Anne's Seminary at Jerusalem to train Greek Melchite clergy of that rite. The seminary would operate until 1967.

In 1894 a mission in French Sudan (now Mali) was founded.

Present day
These now form the present Lakes Archdioceses of Kampala, Gitega, Tabora, and the dioceses of Kigoma, Lilongwe, and Kalemie-Kirungu.

The society is composed of missionary priests and brothers. The members are bound by an oath engaging them to labour for the conversion of Africa according to the constitutions of their society. The missionaries are not, strictly speaking, a religious institute, whether "order" or "congregation". Instead, they are a society of apostolic life. They may retain their own property; but they may expend it in the society only at the direction of the superiors.

The White Fathers, meaning the members of the international Missionary Society of priest and brothers,  were:

 2,098 in 1998
 1,712 in 2007.

At present, in 2021, the Society is reparted as follows:  

-1,144 Missionaries of Africa – fully professed priests, deacons and brothers:

-467 are living and working in Europe

-120 in the Americas

-510 in Africa

-15 in Asia  

-31 in the Generalate in Rome  

Although there are 460 students now at various stages of preparation, many of these White Fathers are retired because of age or ill health. It raises the question of the future of the Society which is disappearing in Europe.

Formation 
Becoming a White Father in the present is much longer than before. To complete the process of preparation, the candidates must first spend one year in a preparatory centre. Then comes the study of Philosophy for 3 or 4 years. The next step is the Spiritual Year which takes place in one of 3 centres in Africa. Two are English-speaking, one is French-speaking. The final period of study of 4 years takes place in Africa or Jerusalem.

Aims
One of the chief points in the rule is in regard to community life in the missions, each house being obliged to contain at least three members. At the head of the society is a General-Superior, elected every six years by the chapter. He resides in Rome at the Generalate house on Via Aurelia. Those desiring to become priests or brothers are admitted to the novitiate after their philosophical studies. After the novitiate they spent two years of missionary training on the field and four years of theology. This training can be slightly different for brother candidates. The theological studies are spent in scholasticate presently located in Abidjan (Ivory Coast), Nairobi (Kenya), Merrivale (Devon), South Africa and Jerusalem. The society admits persons of all nationalities.

The Missionaries of Africa society claims that, from its origins, it has aimed for the ‘evangelising' of the African continent and the presence of Islam in the world. The different areas in which the White Fathers have been predominately active since their foundation by leader, Charles- Martial Allemand- Lavigerie, include: the establishment and development of new Christian communities in Africa; the formation of laity and clergy; social works; the struggle for justice within these African countries; rural development; and the attempted conversion of believers of other faiths, especially in opposition to Islam. 
 
The White Fathers lived in Regional Houses, with each house being obliged to contain three members. The General-Superior is at the head of the society and is selected every six years by the chapter. There are often archives found within these Regional Houses which tell of the progress and aims in which the White Fathers wished to pursue. The archives to be found in the Regional House outside Mwanza in Tanzania, allow an insight into the research done in those areas in which the White Fathers lived and worked.  
 
Within the archives there are Rapports Annuales and a full set of Chronique Trimestrielle detailing the White Fathers’ progress of the pursuit of their aims from the 1880s through to the late 1950s. The Chronique Trimestrielle was published four times a year, containing information about the mission and their work in the surrounding area and community. The Rapports Annuales consisted of a variety of statistics, including, number of missionaries; catechists; neophytes; catechumans; baptisms of various categories; marriages; confessions; confirmations; and the number of boys and girls attending school for each mission station. Within these recordings and reports, education was one of the main aims.

Leadership 

From 1874 under the leadership of Archbishop (later Cardinal) Charles-Martial Allemand-Lavigerie, General Superiors served the role of being in overall charge of the Society. After the death of Charles-Martial Allemand-Lavigerie in 1892, the Superior General's position changed to one of ultimate leadership as their work was no longer overseen by a Cardinal or Archbishop.
 
Today the leader of the General Council is the Superior General, Father Stanley Lubungo from Zambia, and he has four assistant councillors: Didier Sawadogo (Burkina Faso), Francis Barnes (British), Martin Grenier (Canadian), and Ignatius Anipu (Ghanaian). These individuals have specific areas of responsibility such as which countries they interact with which allows them to travel visiting various regions before returning to Rome. Everyone who serves in the council and gains leadership is elected, with the next election due in 2022.

The table below lists all the General Superiors from 1874 until the present day:

African perspectives of the 'White Fathers' 

Africans regularly articulated their views and were not afraid to apply pressure to the missionaries such as using military resistance which was bitter but well organised. A bishop was appointed in Algiers in 1838. Bishop Antoine-Adolphe Dupuch, who was born in Algeria, was a bishop who was eager to convert Emir Abd el-Kadar to Christianity yet while doing so. He established a dialogue and friendly relations with the emir of Algiers. The political and military powers were slow to accept the Christian missions in the region as well as some Freemasons also refused to support the missionaries. Bishop Lavigerie made sure that there would be no conversions of Muslims to Christianity as he understood how rooted many were to their faith, Lavigerie came to this understanding after coming to Algeria he realised that Algerian Islam was different to that of Islam practised in Syria and he feared that proselytism would cause unrest among the Muslim population, his position was informed by Emir Abd el-Kader who risked his safety and whose actions and influence had protected and sheltered many Christians in 1860 during the Druze conflict which was a civil conflict between local Druze and Christians. Many White Fathers understood Islam and maintained the course of dialogue during World Wars, wars of decolonisation and post-colonial crises, which meant that Africans began to trust them and learn alongside them as the White Fathers did not have the intention of forcing religion on to them. However, not many White Fathers understood the meaning of Islam and how important this faith was but were willing to learn some more about the religion and its teachings than others. For Africans this allowed them to build a relationship with the missionaries and many chose to convert to Christianity on their own terms.

Zambia 
The White fathers were once the largest missionary society in Zambia. In 1891, the White Fathers established their first station among the Mambwe, an ethnic group from northeastern Zambia, in the Tanganyika-Malawi corridor. This establishment makes them the earliest to settle in the country, even before the effective inception of British rule after the Berlin Conference in 1885 which gave the Zambia territory to the British power.  

In 1895 Joseph Dupont took over the Mambwe mission. He directed his effort toward the dominant ethnic group in Northern Zambia, the Bemba.  

Joseph Dupont then contacted the Bemba royalty. This action was in line with Lavigerie's instructions. The founding Cardinal believed in the ‘Clovis Model’: this model was a strategy of conversion in order to Christianise the indigenous people from Zambia. The strategy consisted of the idea that you needed to persuade the King to convert first and then the population will follow and convert to Christianism as well.

The White Fathers claimed to be successful in converting at least some of the Bemba to Christianity. However, Britain, which wanted to exercise indirect colonial power in this area, refused to allow the French White Fathers to set up missions before 1900. But, by the 1930s, the White Fathers oversaw twenty missions located in the eastern provinces of Zambia.

Following the request of Zambia authorities for the bones of Joseph Dupont, the bishop's bones were reburied at Chilubula mission on 15 December 2000. This event was, rather unusual, in that it happened 88 years after the members of the ‘White Fathers’ had left Zambia. It shows the influence the White Fathers had at the time and still have in Zambia to this day.  

Even today, Lusaka, is home to the ‘White Fathers’ headquarters, where the archivale collection remains, and was updated in 2001 by Father Hugo Hinfelaar.

Dress and membership 
Africa is a continent with high levels of Islamic worship which meant that the White Fathers would wear robes that resembled those of Algerian Arabs. Algerian Arab robes were ones filled with colours and patterns which were known as kaftans, while the White Father missionaries were usually pure white and, in some cases, black. The design was also different as it resembled more of a cassock, which is a coat that is a piece of Christian clerical clothing and is worn mainly in the Catholic Church. However, the climate across Africa meant that wearing a cassock would not be suitable, so robes were designed with inspiration from a gandoura, which is a popular article of clothing in Africa made from cotton and a light material, which suits the weather conditions. To accompany this was a long white cloak known as a burnous. These men would wear a rosary around their neck to show that they were men of religion and prayer, and the rosary resembled the misbaha of the Marabouts.

Archives 

The official archives of the Missionaries of Africa (‘The White Fathers’) are in Rome, Italy. This archival collection is deemed private. However, researchers can gain access on request. They are currently managed by the General Secretariat of the Society, and their archivist is Father Dominique Arnauld.

Whilst today the official languages of the society are French and English, most records and the limited electronic collection are organised in the French language. The archives hold a variety of materials ranging from correspondence, reports, general administration and publications from their founder Cardinal Lavigerie.

This centralised archive is deemed essential to those researching Sub-Saharan African history as it contains a wide availability of resources.  However, many are unaware of the regional ‘White Fathers’ archives that exist within Africa itself.

The archive at the ‘White Fathers’ headquarters in Lusaka, Zambia, was most recently updated in 2001, overseen by Father Hugo Hinfelaar. The collections had been held until 1996 at the Ilondola missions ‘Language Learning Centre’, which had been an open facility for researchers since 1960. The collections were mainly created and catalogued by Father Louis Oger until he died in 1996. These included materials detailing the society's administration, history and personnel. By moving the collections to Lusaka, Zambia, the archive has become much more accessible, and they are actively seeking to expand their collections.

A similar regional archive exists in Mwanza, Tanzania and details the activities of the ‘White Fathers’ who worked in this area. Although small, it provides a valuable insight into the societies missions and contains documents such as the ‘Reports Annuels’.  The latter compiles statistics related to the ‘White Fathers’ work, ranging from the number of Sisters to baptisms. Records such as this are not available in Rome, demonstrating the importance of seeking various archival sources and not solely those from the central archive.

Photographic archives related to the ‘White Fathers missionary work from throughout the 20th century can be found in various archives such as in the Smithsonian, which provide images of the missions and the Africans living near them in Rwanda and Burundi.  Similar photographs exist in the University of Birmingham archives and detail a variety of missionary work in several African countries.

See also

 Catholic missions
 Bishop Burkhard Huwiler
 Bishop Joseph Dupont
 Melkite Greek Catholic Church
 Mua Mission, Malawi
 Catholic youth sports associations of French Algeria

References

External links
 International Website of the Missionaries of Africa
 Missionaries of Africa UK
 Missionaries of Africa in West Africa

 
Religious organizations established in 1868
Catholic organizations established in the 19th century